Hickman House may refer to:

(by state)
Hickman House (Camden, Arkansas), listed on the NRHP in Ouachita County, Arkansas
Hickman Row, Claymont, DE, listed on the NRHP in New Castle County, Delaware
William Hickman House, Winchester, Kentucky, NRHP-listed
Thomas Hickman House, New Franklin, Missouri, NRHP-listed